Tlapacoyan is a small city in Veracruz, Mexico. It is located about three hours by automobile away from the state capital Xalapa-Enríquez.

Tlapacoyan's population is around 100,000 people.

Tourism

Places to visit

Filobobos is a nearby natural reserve area for exploring nature. The river and rapids lead through a series of caves and beautiful interior waterfalls, and locals at the river entrances arrange short or longer guided rafting adventures through the caves.

Populated places in Veracruz